Hometown Jamboree was an American country music radio and television show simultaneously broadcast each Saturday night by KXLA radio, Pasadena, California and KLAC-TV/KCOP and KTLA-TV, Los Angeles, California beginning in 1949.

Synopsis
The show was created by and hosted by Cliffie Stone and first held at the American Legion Stadium in El Monte, California, and later at the Harmony Park Ballroom in Anaheim, California. Hometown Jamboree was sponsored by the Hub Furniture store once it moved to Anaheim. The show was the springboard for many of country music's premier musicians including Tennessee Ernie Ford, Billy Strange, Zane Ashton (aka Bill Aken), Speedy West, and a host of others. The show ended each week with the cast singing a hymn, a tradition Tennessee Ernie Ford brought to his own program The Ford Show Starring Tennessee Ernie Ford. By that time, Cliffie Stone was Ford's personal manager.

Hometown Jamboree premiered as a weekly TV broadcast in December 1949 over KLAC-TV (later known as KCOP) in Los Angeles; in 1953 it moved to KTLA-TV, where it ran until its cancellation in 1959.

Performers 

 Charlie Aldrich
 Molly Bee
 Jeanne Black
 Jimmy Bryant
 Tennessee Ernie Ford
 Dallas Frazier
 Johnny Horton
 Ferlin Husky
 Skeets McDonald
 Merrill Moore
 Joanie O'Brien
 Gene O'Quin
 Tommy Sands
 Carl Saunders
 Cliffie Stone
 Billy Strange
 Bucky Tibbs
 Merle Travis
 Speedy West

References
 Hillbilly-Music.com
 Encyclopedia of Country, Western & Gospel Music

American country music radio programs
Country music television series